Sylvester Bliss (1814–1863) was a Millerite minister; editor and author.

Biography
Bliss was a Congregationalist from Hartford, Connecticut, with a radical education, he also belonged to the Historical Society of Boston. And he was the Millerite leader in Boston, 
Massachusetts.

He wrote articles for the Millerite magazine Signs of the Times which helped him to get a job as an assistant editor in November 1842. He stayed at that position for many years and then became the only editor of the magazine which was renamed Advent Herald. Bliss held the position of editor until his death in 1863, from natural causes. He was also editor of the Millerite magazine Advent Shield.

See also 

 Adventist
 Millerites
 William Miller (preacher)

References

External links 
 
 
 An Exposition of the Twenty-fourth of Matthew by Sylvester Bliss (1843)
 Inconsistencies of Colver's Literal Fulfilment of Daniel's Prophecy by Sylvester Bliss (1843)
 The Chronology of the Bible by Sylvester Bliss (1843)
 Review of Rev. O. E. Daggett's Sermon by Sylvester Bliss (1843)
 Exposition of Zechariah XIV by Sylvester Bliss (1843)
 Reasons for Our Hope by Sylvester Bliss (1843)
 Memoirs of William Miller by Sylvester Bliss (1853)
 A Brief Commentary on the Apocalypse by Sylvester Bliss (1853)

Adventism
Millerites
1814 births
1863 deaths
Religious leaders from Hartford, Connecticut